Ellen Pettitt (born 13 May 1986 in Perth) is an Australian high jumper turned triple jumper.

She finished sixth at the 2003 World Youth Championships and at the 2006 Commonwealth Games.

Her personal best in the high jump is 1.91 metres, first achieved in March 2006 in Melbourne. Her triple jump personal best is 13.54 metres, set in 2014 in Glasgow.

Achievements

References

1986 births
Living people
Australian female high jumpers
Athletes (track and field) at the 2006 Commonwealth Games
Athletes (track and field) at the 2010 Commonwealth Games
Athletes (track and field) at the 2014 Commonwealth Games
Commonwealth Games competitors for Australia
Sportswomen from Western Australia
Athletes from Perth, Western Australia
Australian Athletics Championships winners
Competitors at the 2009 Summer Universiade
Competitors at the 2013 Summer Universiade
20th-century Australian women
21st-century Australian women